Francisco Sánchez de la Barreda y Vera. (died Santiago, Chile, January or February 1738); Spanish attorney and colonial administrator.  Being the oldest member of the Real Audiencia of Chile made him become governor of Chile when Gabriel Cano died.  He was a governor between November 1733 and May 1734.

Biography

Early life 
Francisco was born in Santiago, Chile.  He studied to become a Doctor of Law.

Government
According to historian Diego Barros Arana the government of Barreda was as short and irrelevant.  During his government the cabildo of Santiago sent a request to the viceroy of Perú to have Mauricio de Zavala confirmed as governor of Barreda until the arrival of titular governor Bruno, who had to arrive to Chile through Buenos Aires. Zavala would never have this position.  The news about some Dutch ships which had cast anchor in the neighborhoods of Valdivia spread and they arrived to governor Barreda. He sent 200 men to avoid a disembarkation and to avoid possible smugglings.
He inaugurated the Caja de Recogidas, a work begun by Gabriel Cano, in Santiago.  This institution worked as an asylum and jail of women at the same time.

The government of Barreda ended when the viceroy José de Armendáriz, Marquis of Castelfuerte, decided not to confirm him and instead appointed as governor a member of the army, the Maestro de Campo of the army in Chile, Manuel Silvestre de Salamanca Cano.

Legacy 

After his death, his family became poor.

Other facts 
He lived for one year in Lima, in 1712. 
His house was one of the few which survived the earthquake in Santiago 8 July 1730 and he lodged the Augustine nuns, who had been affected by the earthquake.  He was engaged to a woman named Isabel Espinoza with whom he had a son called Domingo.  Domingo would become a priest and chaplain of the Real Audiencia of Chile.

Royal Governors of Chile
Year of birth missing
1738 deaths